Cretatriacanthidae is an extinct family of prehistoric ray-finned fish.

Genera
Cretatriacanthus Tyler & Sorbini, 1996
Slovenitriacanthus Tyler & Križnar, 2013

References

Tetraodontiformes
Prehistoric ray-finned fish families